Love Field is a 1992 American drama film written by Don Roos and directed by Jonathan Kaplan, starring Michelle Pfeiffer and Dennis Haysbert. It was released in the United States on December 11, 1992, by Orion Pictures. It is an example of a representation of the assassination of John F. Kennedy in popular culture. For her performance, Pfeiffer earned an Academy Award nomination for Best Actress.

Plot 
In November 1963, Dallas housewife Lurene Hallett (Michelle Pfeiffer) is obsessed with First Lady Jacqueline Kennedy. Lurene feels a special connection with Jackie through her own loss of a child. Knowing that President John F. Kennedy and his wife will be visiting Dallas, Lurene travels to Love Field Airport to try to catch a glimpse of the couple as they arrive by plane on November 22, 1963. Driving away a few hours later, she notices a quiet chaos developing, and discovers that the President has been assassinated. Lurene leaves her car in the middle of the street and rushes to watch the news through a store window. Lurene's anguish over Kennedy's death reflects the collective grief of the nation over this tragedy. Ignoring her overbearing husband, Ray (Brian Kerwin), she travels by bus to attend the funeral in Washington, D.C. Much to the chagrin of the black patrons on the bus, Lurene constantly discusses the assassination during the bus ride. During her journey, she befriends Jonell (Stephanie McFadden), the young black daughter of Paul Cater (Dennis Haysbert). After the bus has an accident, Lurene notices wounds on Jonell's body. Lurene senses something is wrong, suspects Paul and calls the FBI to report that there has been a kidnapping. Moments after her well-intentioned interference, Paul explains that Jonell's wounds are from an orphanage that he rescued her from and he is indeed her real father. Nevertheless, Lurene's FBI call leads the three of them on an increasingly difficult road trip across America with both the police and Ray in pursuit. During the film, Lurene and Paul develop a deep relationship, leading to a one-night sexual encounter. The police eventually catch the pair, and Paul is sentenced to a year in jail.

The film then flashes forward to 1964 (as indicated by a Lyndon Johnson-Hubert Humphrey campaign poster attached to a tree) to show Lurene visiting Jonell in a foster home where she has been staying. Evidently, Lurene has been visiting Jonell regularly. In one scene, Lurene explains to Jonell that her father is coming back to take her home later that day. As Lurene leaves the group home, Paul arrives to pick up Jonell. They stop to talk and Lurene informs Paul that she and Ray are divorced. Paul and Lurene hug and Lurene drives away. However, Lurene turns her car around and rushes back into the group home to join Paul and Jonell.

Cast

 Michelle Pfeiffer as Louise Irene "Lurene" Hallett
 Dennis Haysbert as Paul Cater
 Stephanie McFadden as Jonell, Paul's daughter
 Brian Kerwin as Ray Hallett, Lurene's husband
 Louise Latham as Mrs. Enright, Hazel's mother
 Peggy Rea as Mrs. Heisenbuttal, Lurene's neighbor
 Beth Grant as Hazel Enright, Lurene's boss 
 Cooper Huckabee as Deputy Swinson
 Troy Evans as Lt. Galvan
 Mark Miller as Trooper Exley
 Pearl Jones as Mrs. Baker
 Rhoda Griffis as Jacqueline Kennedy
 Bob Gill as John F. Kennedy
 Nick Searcy as FBI man
 Joe Maggard as Redneck

Production
The film was partially filmed on location in Rocky Mount and Wilson, North Carolina, United States.

Denzel Washington was attached to the role of Paul Cater, but was replaced by Dennis Haysbert just before filming commenced.

The character of Lurene Hallett was based upon screenwriter Don Roos' own mother.

Depictions of racism in the film
Racism is prevalent throughout the film, as well as displays of discontent from the black community concerning Kennedy's efforts to improve race relations. Despite the efforts of the filmmakers to include the black perspective during this era, one critic complains that the black characters function "merely as analogies of oppression." Criticism aside, it is realistic in its portrayals of violence against Paul by white men, by Lurene, and by her husband, Ray. Historically, it relates to findings of the Kerner Commission from 1968. This commission found that "Our nation is moving toward two societies, one black, one white, separate and unequal." Love Field shows differing opinions about Kennedy in the white and black communities, represented respectively by Lurene and Paul, specifically through Lurene's naïve point of view. For example, in one interaction between Mrs. Enright and Paul, she states, "I don't know when we started killing people to solve things," and he responds, "I didn't know we stopped."

Reception
Although the film was made in 1990, Orion Pictures suffered crippling financial losses and filed for bankruptcy. It was not released until December 1992, in time for Oscar consideration.

Release
The film was released on December 11, 1992, and grossed $1,949,148 in the United States.

Critical response
On Rotten Tomatoes, the film has an approval rating of 40% based on reviews from 10 critics, with an average rating of 5.7/10.

Janet Maslin in The New York Times wrote: "This modest film actually covers a lot of ground... Love Field brings remarkably few preconceptions to the telling of its understated story. The characters transcend stereotypes, but what really matters is the actors' ability to breathe these people to life." Time Out was similarly positive, writing: "This affecting romantic comedy probes the gradations of racial prejudice still prevalent in the South despite JFK's best efforts... unaccountably denied a theatrical release in Britain, this is a most impressive and enjoyable work." On the negative side, Variety described it as "a sincere, not fully realized 1960s drama that is yet another variation on the 'Where were you when you heard JFK was shot?' theme." Hal Hinson in The Washington Post thought that "the interracial love affair that develops between this oddly matched pair never makes much sense." Roger Ebert in the Chicago Sun-Times wrote that "the essential truth of the characters was being undercut by all the manufactured gimmicks of the plot."

Critical consensus held that the primary reason to see the film was the Oscar-nominated performance of Michelle Pfeiffer. The New York Times wrote that a "character this flamboyant would risk sinking any film. But Ms. Pfeiffer, again demonstrating that she is as subtle and surprising as she is beautiful, plays Lurene with remarkable grace." The Washington Post called the characterization "a marvel, but by now that is only to be expected. Watching her [Pfeiffer] discover new facets of her talent is one of the real pleasures of going to the movies these days. Done up with a '60s platinum bouffant and butterfly fake eyelashes, Pfeiffer plays Lurene as a big-hearted, motor-mouth ditz. But, even in the movie's earliest scenes, Pfeiffer suggests that Lurene has hidden depth; not unrevealed smarts, really, but innate decency and guilelessness... She's fully alive up there on the screen: a grounded angel, tarnished, funny and exquisitely soulful, even when the movie is dead." Desson Howe wrote: "there is strong reason to watch Love Field simply for Pfeiffer. As the nobly oppressed father (a sort of clichéd, Sidney Poitier role), Haysbert is respectable and doe-eyed McFadden makes a fetching innocent. But Pfeiffer is the movie's sole engine. Tucking away her gratuitous beauty behind pancake makeup and that blonde hay-er, she's in effortless, sassy command." Peter Travers in Rolling Stone was of the opinion that "Pfeiffer overcomes the poky direction of Jonathan Kaplan (The Accused) and the unfocused script by Don Roos (of Single White Female infamy). She weaves magic in a portrayal of striking grace notes... long after Love Field hits a dead end, Pfeiffer cuts a path to the heart." Time Out called it a "marvellously touching, funny and credible performance," while for Variety it was "yet another memorable characterization." Roger Ebert congratulated her for a performance "which takes a woman who could have become a comic target and invests her with a certain dignity." Stephen Farber in Movieline wrote: "As Lurene Hallett, a dreamy beautician obsessed with Jackie Kennedy, Pfeiffer confirms her growing range and power. Her skill with accents is beginning to rival Meryl Streep's, but even more impressive than her technical virtuosity is her emotional depth; she highlights the childlike romanticism and generosity of this simple woman."

Awards and nominations

References

External links 

 
 
 

1992 films
1990s English-language films
1992 drama films
American drama films
Films directed by Jonathan Kaplan
Films set in Texas
Films set in 1963
Films set in 1964
Films shot in North Carolina
Films about the assassination of John F. Kennedy
American independent films
Orion Pictures films
Films scored by Jerry Goldsmith
Films with screenplays by Don Roos
Dallas Love Field
Cultural depictions of John F. Kennedy
Cultural depictions of Jacqueline Kennedy Onassis
1990s American films